Lawrence Rose (December 17, 1896 – July 2, 1975) was a professional ice hockey player. He played with the Saskatoon Crescents of the Western Canada Hockey League. He later went on to play in the Prairie Hockey League with the Moose Jaw Maroons and Regina Capitals.

References

External links

1896 births
1975 deaths
Canadian ice hockey defencemen
Ice hockey people from Ontario
Saskatoon Sheiks players
Sportspeople from Peterborough, Ontario
Western Canada Hockey League players